YMH or ymh may refer to:

 YMH, the IATA code for Mary's Harbour Airport, Newfoundland and Labrador, Canada
 ymh, the ISO 639-3 code for Mili language, Yunnan Province, China